These are the results of the women's singles competition, one of two events for female competitors in table tennis at the 2004 Summer Olympics in Athens.

Qualifying Athletes

Seeds
The top 16 seeded players qualified directly to the third round.

   (champion, gold medalist) 
  (quarterfinals)
  (fourth round)
  (semifinals, bronze medalist)
   (quarterfinals)
  (semifinals, fourth place)
  (quarterfinals)
  (third round)
  (third round)
  (third round)
  (fourth round)
   (third round)
  (fourth round)
   (third round)
  (fourth round)
  (fourth round)

The players seeded from 17 to 32 qualified directly to the second round.

  (third round)
  (fourth round)
  (second round)
  (third round)
  (third round)
  (third round)
  (second round)
  (second round)
  (final, silver medalist)
  (second round)
  (third round)
  (third round)
  (quarterfinals)
  (third round)
  (third round)
  (fourth round)

Draw

Finals

Top half

Section 1

Section 2

Bottom half

Section 3

Section 4

Preliminary round

Top half

Section 1

Section 2

Bottom half

Section 3

Section 4

References

External links
 Official Report of the XXVIII Olympiad, v.2. Digitally published by the LA84 Foundation.
 
 2004 Summer Olympics / Table Tennis / Singles, Women. Olympedia.

Table tennis at the 2004 Summer Olympics
Olym
Women's events at the 2004 Summer Olympics